Pantawid Pamilyang Pilipino Program (English: Bridging Program for the Filipino Family), also known as 4Ps and formerly Bangon Pamilyang Pilipino, is a conditional cash transfer program of the Philippine government under the Department of Social Welfare and Development. It aims to eradicate extreme poverty in the Philippines by investing in health and education particularly in ages 0–18. It is patterned on programs in other developing countries like Brazil (Bolsa Familia) and Mexico (Oportunidades). The 4Ps program now operates in 17 regions, 79 provinces and 1,484 municipalities and 143 key cities covering 4,090,667 household beneficiaries as of June 25, 2014.

In April 2019, President Rodrigo Duterte signed a law institutionalizing the 4Ps cash transfer program.

Program structure

Objective
The program focused on these objectives:
Social development: by investing in capability-building, the program will be able to break the intergenerational poverty cycle.
Social assistance: provide cash assistance to address beneficiaries' short-term financial needs.

Eligibility 
The poorest among poor families as identified by a 2003 Small Area Estimate (SAE) survey from the National Statistical Coordination Board (NSCB) are eligible. The poorest among the poor are selected through a proxy-means test. Economic indicators such as ownership of assets, type of housing, education of the household head, livelihood of the family and access to water and sanitation facilities are proxy variables to indicate the family economic category. Additional qualifications for households include having children 0–14 years old and/or pregnant women during the assessment. Applicants must agree on all the conditions set by the government to enter the program.

External links

References

Department of Social Welfare and Development (Philippines)
Poverty in the Philippines
Presidency of Gloria Macapagal Arroyo
Presidency of Benigno Aquino III
Presidency of Rodrigo Duterte